Balleroy-sur-Drôme (literally Balleroy on Drôme) is a commune in the department of Calvados, northwestern France. The municipality was established on 1 January 2016 by merger of the former communes of Balleroy and Vaubadon.

See also 
Communes of the Calvados department

References 

Communes of Calvados (department)
Populated places established in 2016
2016 establishments in France